Guy B. Roberts is an American government official, lawyer, and retired United States Marine Corps colonel who served as the Assistant Secretary of Defense for Nuclear, Chemical, and Biological Defense Programs from 2017 to 2019. He previously was the president of GBR Consulting, a national security consulting firm. Roberts was also a senior associate with the Center for Strategic and International Studies and an adjunct professor teaching courses on homeland security, international terrorism, non-proliferation, and arms control at Mary Washington University and Virginia Commonwealth University. He previously served as the Deputy Assistant Secretary General for Weapons of Mass Destruction Policy and Director of Nuclear Policy for the North Atlantic Treaty Organization. Roberts received the Exceptional Public Service Award from the Department of Defense. He served for 25 years in the United States Marine Corps, concluding his career as the Staff Judge Advocate for U.S. Southern Command and retiring as a colonel.

In June 2019, it was reported by Foreign Policy that Roberts had resigned from his position as Assistant Secretary of Defense for Nuclear, Chemical, and Biological Defense Programs effective April 2, 2019.

References

External links
 Biography at the U.S. Department of Defense
 Biography at the American Security Project
 Guy B. Roberts at C-SPAN

Living people
Arizona State University alumni
University of Denver alumni
Georgetown University alumni
University of Southern California alumni
Naval War College alumni
20th-century American lawyers
21st-century American lawyers
United States Marine Corps officers
Trump administration personnel
Year of birth missing (living people)
United States Assistant Secretaries of Defense